Kichan is a village de facto in the Martakert Province of the breakaway Republic of Artsakh, de jure in the Agdam District of Azerbaijan, in the disputed region of Nagorno-Karabakh. The village has an ethnic Armenian-majority population, and also had an Armenian majority in 1989.

History 
During the Soviet period, the village was a part of the Mardakert District of the Nagorno-Karabakh Autonomous Oblast.

Historical heritage sites 
Historical heritage sites in and around the village include the monastery of Anapat and a cemetery from between the 12th and 18th centuries, a 13th-century khachkar, an 18th-century chapel, and the 19th-century church of Surb Astvatsatsin.

Economy and culture 
The population is mainly engaged in agriculture and animal husbandry. As of 2015, the village has a municipal building, a secondary school, two shops and a medical centre.

Demographics 
The village had 168 inhabitants in 2005, and 178 inhabitants in 2015.

References

External links 
 

Populated places in Aghdam District
Populated places in Martakert Province